GoodPop is an American brand of "all-natural" ice pops, headquartered in Austin, Texas. The company was founded in 2009 by then University of Texas student Daniel Goetz 

GoodPop is a participant in The Non-GMO Project.

GoodPops come in flavor combinations such as: Cookies N’ Cream, Orange N’ Cream, Hibiscus Mint, Coldbrew Coffee, Strawberry Lemonade, Banana Cinnamon, Chocolate Milk, Watermelon Agave, Strawberry, Coconut Lime, and Red, White & Blue (Cherry Lemonade).

References 

American brands
Ice cream brands
Companies based in Austin, Texas